Novella Calligaris (born 27 December 1954) is a retired Italian swimmer, and the first Italian to win an Olympic medal in swimming. Her elder brother Mauro Calligaris was also an Olympic swimmer.

Biography
Aged 13 Calligaris competed at the 1968 Olympics in the 200 m, 400 m and 800 m freestyle, but was eliminated in the heats of all events. At 14, she set her first European record. At the 1972 Summer Olympics, she won a medal in every event she competed: a silver medal in the 400 m freestyle, a bronze in the 800 m freestyle, and another bronze in the 400 m individual medley.

The following year, the first FINA World Championships took place in Belgrade. On 9 September 1973, Novella swam 8:52.97 in the 800 m freestyle event, setting a new world record and winning a gold medal. In the same competition she also finished third in the 400 m freestyle and 400 m individual medley.

At the 1974 European Championships, she won two medals, one silver and one bronze. These were the last international achievements of her career, which ended shortly afterward. In retirement she coached swimming, and in the 1980s worked with the junior national team in Rome.

During her career Calligaris won 76 national titles and set 82 national and 21 European records. Until Federica Pellegrini's second place in 200 m freestyle at the 2004 Athens Olympics, she was the only Italian woman to win an Olympic medal in swimming. In 1986 she was inducted to the International Swimming Hall of Fame.

See also
 List of members of the International Swimming Hall of Fame
Italian sportswomen multiple medalists at Olympics and World Championships
Italy national swimming team – Multiple medalists
World record progression 800 metres freestyle

References

External links
 

1954 births
Living people
Sportspeople from Padua
Olympic swimmers of Italy
Swimmers at the 1968 Summer Olympics
Swimmers at the 1972 Summer Olympics
Olympic bronze medalists for Italy
Italian female swimmers
World record setters in swimming
Olympic bronze medalists in swimming
Italian female freestyle swimmers
Italian female medley swimmers
World Aquatics Championships medalists in swimming
European Aquatics Championships medalists in swimming
Medalists at the 1972 Summer Olympics
Olympic silver medalists for Italy
Olympic silver medalists in swimming
Mediterranean Games gold medalists for Italy
Swimmers at the 1971 Mediterranean Games
Mediterranean Games medalists in swimming
20th-century Italian women
21st-century Italian women